Vicente Daclan Rubi (January 23, 1903 – November 12, 1980) was a Filipino Visayan musician from Cebu, Philippines best known for composing the Philippine Christmas carol Kasadyaa Ning Taknaa, which was translated into Tagalog, Ang Pasko ay Sumapit, by National Artist Levi Celerio. He was one of the top 100 Cebuano personalities according to The Freeman.

Early life
Vicente D. Rubi was born the youngest of four children in Kamagayan District, Cebu City on January 22, 1903. Rubi was a respected name known for musical talent in Cebu province, especially in Mactan. Acquiring the basic elementary education and known by his nickname "Noy Inting", he worked in sugar farms in the provincial towns of Cebu. He was married to Brigida Aseniero, fathering four children namely Rudolfo, Alberto, Ludivina, and Edilberto.

Career
A composer of daygon (carol) and balitaw (song), he was a fan of musical dramas and plays which were popular during his time. While he created musical compositions through a guitar, his wife would help him set them on to the music sheets. He had composed more than a hundred songs, and among his works were Pasko Na, Among Daygon, Nag-ambahan, Pasko nga Halandumon, and Maglipay Kita. One of his compositions, Carmela, remained a popular Cebuano kundiman interpreted by present-day balladeers.

Kasadya Ning Taknaa 
Rubi is best known for composing the Kasadya Ning Taknaa (How Joyous This Season Is), a Christmas carol whose lyrics was written by his friend, Mariano Vestil. The Rubi family used to reside in a house along what is now known as Paulino Gullas Street in Cebu City, where a festival was held nearby in Pili-Kanipaan (now Manalili Street) every December. According to columnist Juan L. Mercado, the song was composed in 1933 after officials of the Cebu Christmas festival asked him to join the daygon (carol) songwriting contest, and the said composition won.

Another account claimed that the song was composed by the request of Cebuano playwright Rafael Policarpio who needed it to be played during a caroling scene in one of his  plays. After the curtains drew to a close when the play was staged in Lapu-lapu City, the song quickly became popular. It was a hit in Leyte, Negros, Bohol, and other Cebuano-speaking provinces and had become part of the classic repertoire of Cebuano yuletide songs ever since.

Royalties
The Mareco Recording Company in Manila bought the song in 1950 and compensated him ₱50 as advance royalty and additional three cents for each sold record. However, he was only given 110.25 of the  ₱1,994.63 collectible in 1967 and the company's financial reports showed that his composition sold 62,812 records during the period between 1966 and 1975. In 1976, with the help of his lawyer Napoleon Rama, he filed a lawsuit to claim the unpaid royalties in Quezon City, but it was dismissed two months later because of his inability to travel due to lack of funds. The company also claimed that checks were made in his name; however, they were not delivered because he moved to different addresses with his wife twice as he avoided staying with his children who had started their own families. Three years later, he filed a suit before the court of Judge Hernando Salas in Cebu together with his counsel, Ramon Ceniza, who also requested that Rubi be exempted from paying court fees due to his poverty.  

He also pursued to be granted copyright on the song before the National Library. His petition was declined by virtue of the passage of the intellectual property law covered by Presidential Decree No. 49.

Ang Pasko ay Sumapit
As early as 1990, Napoleon Rama criticized the consideration of the Tagalog version, Ang Pasko Ay Sumapit, as an original composition and the absence of credit to Rubi and Vestil. Actress Chai Fonacier and Kultura Bisaya Foundation Ivar Tulfo Gica also criticized the lack of attribution. Mercado wrote in the Philippine Daily Inquirer that described Ang Pasko Ay Sumapit as the hijacked Tagalog version of Kasadya Ning Taknaa.

An article by Esquire magazine drew controversy when it traced the provenance of Ang Pasko ay Sumapit to Celerio. It published a new piece, indicating the competing claims of Rubi, Celerio, and Cenizal with Rubi credited to have composed the song in 1933, Cenizal creating a marching song similar to its tune in 1937, and Celerio coming up with the Tagalog lyrics.

Later years
A few months before his demise, he composed his final song, Mahanaw ang Tanan. He died a poor widower, succumbing to prostate cancer in November 12, 1980 and his body was buried at the Carreta cemetery. Eight years later, the court in Cebu ruled in his favor and ordered unpaid royalties to be given to his estate.

Awards
Rubi received posthumous awards for his contribution to Cebuano and Philippine music and was recognized by the Province of Cebu, Cebu Arts Foundation, Mayor Florentino Solo of Cebu City, and Basic Industries Foundation. He was also the recipient of the Jose R. Gullas Awards and considered one of the top 100 Cebuano personalities.

Works 
According to The Freeman, below are some of his works.

 Among Daygon  
Carmela
Harana
Kasadyaa Ning Taknaa
Laylay sa Kalanggaman
Maglipay Kita
Nag Ambahan
Pasko Na
Pasko Nga Halandumon
Walay Balatian
 Bidlisiw
Gililong Ko Lang
 Mitu-o Ako
 Sayo sa Kabutagon (Early Morning)
 Nagsaad ug Nanumpa (Promising and Vowing)

References

1903 births
1980 deaths
People from Cebu City
Artists from Cebu
Musicians from Cebu
20th-century Filipino musicians